Geshem may refer to:
Geshem (גשם), a Hebrew word for "rain," applied mostly to the rains which occur in Israel over the course of the fall and winter.
This half of the year is called in the Mishnah "yemot ha-geshamin" (days of rains). 
By extension, the word Geshem refers to the piyyutim for rain recited at the Musaf service of Shemini Atzeret marking the beginning of the rainy season in Israel.
Geshem (Bible) or Gashmu, Arab leader who, along with Tobiah, opposed Nehemiah in the reconstruction of Jerusalem.